Khan Abbasi (also Romanized as Khān ‘Abbāsī) is a village in Kolijan Rostaq-e Sofla Rural District, in the Central District of Sari County, Mazandaran Province, Iran. At the 2006 census, its population was 291, in 72 families.

References 

Populated places in Sari County